Adilophontes is an extinct monospecific genus of bear dogs, endemic to North America during the Oligocene to Miocene. Fossils have been found in Wyoming.

References

Bear dogs
Miocene bear dogs
Oligocene caniforms
Burdigalian genus extinctions
Oligocene mammals of North America
Rupelian genus first appearances
Miocene mammals of North America
Prehistoric carnivoran genera